Ristevski is a Macedonian-language surname. Notable people with the surname include:

 Aleksandar Ristevski, Macedonian footballer
 Antonio Ristevski, Macedonian alpine skier
 Kire Ristevski, Macedonian footballer

Macedonian-language surnames